Brian Joseph Kirkland (born January 22, 1981) is an American politician who served as a Democratic member of the Pennsylvania House of Representatives for the 159th district from 2017 to 2022.

Early life and education
Kirkland graduated from Coatesville Area High School and attended East Stroudsburg University.

Career
Kirkland served as Special Projects Coordinator for the city of Chester, Pennsylvania.

Kirkland served as Director of Constituent Services for his Uncle, Thaddeus Kirkland during his tenure as state representative to the Pennsylvania 159th district.

Kirkland was elected in 2016 as state representative to the Pennsylvania 159th district and replaced his Uncle Thaddeus Kirkland by defeating the Republican candidate Michael Ciach.

Kirkland served on the Committee On Committees, Gaming Oversight, Tourism & Recreational Development, and Urban Affairs committees.

Kirkland was defeated in the May 2022 Democratic primary by Carol Kazeem.

Personal life
Kirkland lives in Chester, Pennsylvania and has a daughter.

Kirkland is a deacon at the Community Baptist Church in Chester, Pennsylvania where he runs a youth mentoring program.

References

External links
Pennsylvania House of Representatives - Brian Joseph Kirkland (Democrat) official PA House website

1981 births
21st-century American politicians
African-American state legislators in Pennsylvania
Living people
Democratic Party members of the Pennsylvania House of Representatives
People from Chester, Pennsylvania
21st-century African-American politicians
20th-century African-American people